Brady Smith (born 10 August 1989 in Gosford, New South Wales) is an Australian footballer who plays for NSW Premier League side Central Coast Mariners Academy.

Club career
Smith made his debut for the Mariners in a 3–0 victory over Newcastle Jets in Round 26 of the 2009-10 A-League season at Bluetongue Stadium on 8 February 2010, after the game was postponed from 6 February due to a waterlogged pitch. He was a 69th-minute substitute for another Mariners youngster, and captain of the Mariners National Youth League team, Panny Nikas (who was making his first senior start). Smith came up with an assist for Matt Simon's 72nd-minute goal. He has also featured against Wellington Phoenix last season. he scored 45 goal in 20 games making him the best english spain player from japan

References

hes 4ft6

External links
 Central Coast Mariners profile

1989 births
Living people
Association football forwards
Australian soccer players
Central Coast Mariners FC players
Central Coast Mariners Academy players
A-League Men players
National Premier Leagues players
People from Gosford
Sportsmen from New South Wales
Soccer players from New South Wales